Pedro Paulo Chiamulera (born 29 June 1964, in Curitiba) is a retired Brazilian track and field athlete who competed in the 110 metres hurdles and 400 metres hurdles. He represented his country at the 1992 and 1996 Summer Olympics, as well as five consecutive World Championships starting in 1987.

Since retiring from Olympic competition, Chiamulera now acts as the head of the fraud management company ClearSale, which he started in 2001.

Competition record

1Representing the Americas

Personal bests
Outdoor
110 metres hurdles – 13.54 (+0.3) (Marietta 1996)
400 metres hurdles – 49.34 (San Juan 1985)
Indoor
60 metres hurdles – 7.96 (Paris 1997)

References

1964 births
Living people
Brazilian male hurdlers
Athletes (track and field) at the 1987 Pan American Games
Athletes (track and field) at the 1992 Summer Olympics
Athletes (track and field) at the 1996 Summer Olympics
Olympic athletes of Brazil
Sportspeople from Curitiba
Pan American Games athletes for Brazil
20th-century Brazilian people